McEntee is an Irish surname. Notable people with the surname include:

Andy McEntee, Irish Gaelic football manager
Edward McEntee (1906–1981), American judge and politician
Eugene McEntee (born 1978), Irish hurler
Gerald McEntee, American labor leader
Gerry McEntee, Irish Gaelic footballer
Helen McEntee (born 1986), Irish politician
James McEntee (Gaelic footballer), Irish Gaelic footballer
James McEntee (labor leader) (1884–1957), American machinist and labor leader
Jervis McEntee (1828–1891), American painter
 John McEntee (political aide), American political aide
John McEntee Bowman (1875–1931), Canadian-born American businessman
John McEntee (Gaelic footballer) (born 1977), Irish Gaelic footballer
 John McEntee (political aide) (born 1990), American staff member in the Trump administration
Mark McEntee (born 1961), Australian musician
Shane McEntee (Gaelic footballer), Irish Gaelic footballer
Shane McEntee (politician) (1956–2012), Irish politician
Valentine McEntee, 1st Baron McEntee (1871–1953), Irish-born British politician
Seán MacEntee (1889–1984), Irish politician

See also
 Máire Mhac an tSaoi (born 1922), Irish poet